Beatien Yazz (born March 5, 1928), also called Jimmy Toddy, is a Navajo American painter born near Wide Ruins, Arizona. He exhibited his work around the world and is known for his paintings of animals and people and for his children's book illustrations. Some of his works have been in the permanent collection of institutions including the Smithsonian American Art Museum, the Gilcrease Museum, the Logan Museum of Anthropology, the Museum of New Mexico, the Philbrook Museum of Art, and the Southwest Museum of the American Indian.

Early life 
Yazz was born to Joe and Desbah Toddy on the Navajo Reservation near Wide Ruins, Arizona. He often went by his English-language name Jimmy Toddy, as well as by variations of Bea Etin Yazz ("Little No Shirt" in Navajo). As a young child, he colored with crayons and enjoyed making art. Bill and Sallie Lippencott, who ran the Wide Ruins Trading Post, recognized his talent and encouraged his art. He exhibited for the first time at age 10, with his work shown at a museum in Springfield, Illinois.

Yazz attended the Wide Ruins Day School, followed by two years at the Santa Fe Indian School. Then he studied for three years at Fort Wingate Indian School and one year at the Sherman Indian High School.

During World War II, Yazz lied about his age in order to serve in the United States Marine Corps as a Code talker, utilizing his knowledge of the Navajo language.

When he returned to the reservation after the war, he dedicated himself to art. In the late 1940s he received a scholarship to study under painter Yasuo Kuniyoshi as part of a summer program at Mills College. During this program, he was able to paint with oil paint from a live model.

Art career 
Though Yazz worked for a time as a police officer in Fort Defiance, Arizona and as an art teacher at Carson Indian School, he dedicated most of his adult life to creating art full time.

Yazz painted subjects familiar to him in a flat, colorful style with minimal backgrounds. He often used casein paint for his works. His paintings "record the natural movement of light and air with powerful drama."

Yazz earned acclaim with collectors by the 1950s. Author Alberta Hannum wrote two popular books about his life, including illustrations by Yazz. Spin a Silver Dollar (Viking Press, 1944) told of his early life meeting the Lippencotts, and its sequel Paint the Wind (1958) continued Yazz's story as a young adult. Spin a Silver Dollar was condensed by Reader's Digest and was presented on Cavalcade of America.

In addition to exhibiting and selling paintings, Yazz also created works on commission. He created some tiles for Gila Pottery, designed fabric on commission for Tumble-weed Prints, and had his work reproduced as greeting cards for a number of companies. Probably his most famous painting was an untitled one used by The Eagles on the front sleeve of their 1974 album On The Border.

By the 1970s, Yazz was suffering from severe eye problems and deteriorating eyesight. A Navajo Medicine man told him this was punishment for painting sacred Navajo figures. Without treatment, his eyes never improved, and Yazz was not able to paint past 1991.

In early 1983, Yazz worked with Sallie Wagner (formerly Sallie Lippencott) and J.J. Brody to publish Yazz: Navajo Painter, which told his life story and included a number of illustrations.

Works 

 Spin a Silver Dollar (1944), by Alberta Hannum
 Paint the Wind (1958), by Alberta Hannum
 Yazz: Navajo Painter (1983), with Sallie Wagner and J.J. Brody

External links 

 Beatien Yazz artworks at MutualArt
 Beatien Yazz artworks at Adobe Gallery

References 

20th-century American painters
20th-century indigenous painters of the Americas
Native American painters
Navajo artists
Painters from Arizona
Native American textile artists
Textile designers
1928 births
Navajo code talkers
20th-century Native Americans
Living people
21st-century Native Americans
Native American illustrators
American children's book illustrators